Paris K. C. Barclay (born June 30, 1956) is an American television director, producer, and writer. He is a two-time Emmy Award winner and is among the busiest single-camera television directors, having directed nearly 200 episodes of television to date, for series such as NYPD Blue, ER, The West Wing, CSI, Lost, The Shield, House, Sons of Anarchy, In Treatment and Glee; and more recently Dahmer – Monster: The Jeffrey Dahmer Story, The Watcher, and American Horror Story: NYC. He also serves as an Executive Producer on many of the shows he directs, and occasionally as a writer or co-creator as well.
From 2013 to 2017, Barclay served two terms as the President of the Directors Guild of America. For the past three years, he has been listed by Variety as “one of 500 most influential business leaders in Hollywood.”

Early life
Barclay was born in Chicago Heights, Illinois. Raised Catholic, he attended La Lumiere School, a private college preparatory boarding school in La Porte, Indiana. On scholarship, he was one of the first African-Americans to attend the school.

Barclay went on to Harvard College, where he was extremely active in student musical theatre productions and the a cappella singing group The Harvard Krokodiloes. During his four years there, he wrote 16 musicals, including the music for two of the annual Hasty Pudding shows. Barclay attended both the La Lumiere School and Harvard with John Roberts, now the Chief Justice of the Supreme Court. His Harvard roommate was novelist Arthur Golden, author of Memoirs of a Geisha.

Music video career
Following his graduation from Harvard, Barclay worked as a copywriter and creative supervisor at Grey, BBDO, Cunningham & Walsh, and Marsteller. Barclay then moved into music video directing and production through his own company, Black & White Television. He directed music videos for Bob Dylan ("It's Unbelievable"), the New Kids On The Block ("Games"), Janet Jackson and Luther Vandross ("The Best Things in Life Are Free"). Most notably, he created eight videos for LL Cool J, including "Mama Said Knock You Out", which won awards from both MTV and Billboard—and went on to be listed by The Rock and Roll Hall of Fame as one of the 500 songs that shaped rock and roll. In 2013, Complex Magazine ranked "Mama Said Knock You Out" as one of the top 50 rap videos of the 1990s, crediting it with creating "one of the most crucial links in establishing the cultural bridge between boxing and rap." Barclay was often hired to direct videos for films, introducing audiences to House Party (1990), White Men Can't Jump (1992), Mo' Money (1992), Posse (1993), and Cool Runnings (1993), among others.

In 2012, Barclay directed his first music video in 16 years, working once again with LL Cool J and R&B star Joe on the video for "Take It".

Also drawing on his music video experience was Barclay's episode ("The Coup") of the Steven Spielberg-produced NBC series Smash, in which TV Fanatic said that the Barclay-directed number for the original song "Touch Me" (written by OneRepublic's Ryan Tedder) "pushed the boundaries from traditional Broadway show to music video level."

Film and television career

1990s
Barclay began his successful career in television with an unaired episode of Angel Street in 1992. He was hired by John Wells, who was making his debut as an executive producer.

Barclay directed Shawn and Marlon Wayans' first feature film, Don't Be a Menace to South Central While Drinking Your Juice in the Hood (1996) – also featuring Keenen Ivory Wayans, Vivica Fox, and Bernie Mac. Although it received mixed reviews, it was a box office success and has built a cult following since its release. Barclay also directed the HBO movie, The Cherokee Kid (1996), a Western dramedy starring Sinbad, James Coburn, Burt Reynolds, Gregory Hines, and A Martinez.

After directing episodes of ER, Barclay directed and eventually became a producer of NYPD Blue. In three years there, Barclay would receive two Emmy Awards for best directing—the second of which was for the episode titled "Hearts and Souls"— featuring the death of Jimmy Smits' character Bobby Simone. The episode has been ranked one of TV Guides 100 Best Episodes of All Time. Barclay reteamed with Smits again in his role as "Nero Padilla" on Sons of Anarchy.

2000s
In 2000, Barclay joined forces with fellow NYPD Blue producers Steven Bochco and Nicholas Wootton to create City of Angels, a medical drama with a predominantly African-American cast including Blair Underwood, Viola Davis, Octavia Spencer, Maya Rudolph, and Vivica Fox. The show aired on CBS for two seasons while winning two NAACP awards.

In 2002 he returned to the John Wells fold to produce and direct the pilot, The Big Time, featuring Christina Hendricks, Dylan Baker, Molly Ringwald and Christopher Lloyd—which eventually aired as a two-hour movie. In the years that followed, Barclay worked on a wide variety of television dramas and comedies. He served as co-executive producer and producing director of the series Cold Case, for which he has also directed nine episodes. Other shows he directed in the decade include The West Wing, Huff, Law & Order, Numb3rs, Lost, House, The Shield, Weeds, Monk,The Good Wife, NCIS: Los Angeles, Sons of Anarchy, CSI, The Mentalist and 9 episodes of Glee.

2008 marked Barclay's return to HBO, where he executive produced three seasons of In Treatment, as well as directed 36 episodes.

Also in 2008, Barclay collaborated with screenwriter Dustin Lance Black to write the MTV film Pedro, the story of Pedro Zamora from The Real World: San Francisco. The film, directed by Nick Oceano, premiered at the Toronto International Film Festival and earned the writers WGA, the Humanitas Prize, and GLAAD Media Awards nominations.

2010–present
In 2011, Barclay became the executive producer and primary director for the fourth season of FX's Sons of Anarchy, a role he continued through the seventh and final season.

Also in 2013, Barclay directed two episodes of Glee, "Diva" and "Lights Out". For his work on "Diva", Barclay was nominated for an Emmy for Outstanding Direction in a Comedy Series, his second Emmy nomination for Glee.

In 2014, Barclay directed the season premiere and penultimate episodes of Sons of Anarchy for the fourth year running. In addition to his Sons of Anarchy duties, Barclay also directed the milestone episode "100" for Glee, for which he received another Emmy nomination, in addition to episodes of The Good Wife, Extant, executive produced by Steven Spielberg and starring Halle Berry, and Manhattan, a Tommy Schlamme/Sam Shaw period drama for WGN America; and Glee's emotional flashback episode "2009" – the first half of the series finale.

In 2015, Barclay continued his role as Executive Producer/Director on FX's The Bastard Executioner, created by Kurt Sutter. The show starred Katey Sagal, Stephen Moyer, and Matthew Rhys. At the end of the year, he was enlisted by FOX to direct an episode of Empire, the Television Critics Association program of the year.

In 2016, Barclay joined the Shondaland family by directing an episode of ABC's critically acclaimed show, Scandal, created/produced by Shonda Rhimes, starring Kerry Washington.

In fall 2016, he completed the first season of FOX's Pitch, from writer/creators Dan Fogelman and Rick Singer, starring Mark-Paul Gosselaar, Ali Larter, Mark Consuelos, Dan Lauria and Kylie Bunbury in the title role.

In spring 2017, Barclay was tapped to direct and executive produce the CBS pilot, Perfect Citizen, a legal drama written and executive produced by former The Good Wife executive producer Craig Turk. Perfect Citizen stars Noah Wyle, Kristin Chenoweth, Brian Stokes Mitchell, Stéphanie Szostak, Adrienne Warren, and Shanley Caswell.

In the same year, Barclay directed the pilot and executive produced another  Shondaland project, Station 19, which follows a group of Seattle firefighters in a spinoff of the highly successful Grey's Anatomy. The show is ABC's second highest rated drama, and is currently airing its sixth season on ABC.

In early 2019, Barclay teamed up with the Human Rights Campaign and fellow award winner Dustin Lance Black to produce and direct a star-studded Americans for the Equality Act public awareness and advertising campaign. The series, which launched on March 25, 2019, with a debut video featuring Academy Award-winning actress Sally Field and her son Sam Greisman, features prominent figures in entertainment, sports and beyond speaking about the need for the Equality Act — a crucial civil rights bill that would extend clear, comprehensive non-discrimination protections to millions of LGBTQ people nationwide. The powerhouse lineup of supportive film and television actors, influencers, musicians and professional athletes, includes Adam Rippon, Shea Diamond, Alexandra Billings, Blossom Brown, Justina Machado, Gloria Calderon Kellett, Jamie Lee Curtis, Jane Lynch, Jesse Tyler Ferguson and Justin Mikita, Charlie and Max Carver, Karamo Brown, Marcia Gay Harden, and Nyle DiMarco. The Americans for the Equality Act series is modeled after HRC's successful Americans for Marriage Equality campaign and was awarded at the 4th Annual Shorty Social Good awards, and helped lead to the passage of the act in the House of Representatives.

In May 2021, Barclay directed a virtual reading of Larry Kramer's The Normal Heart, with Sterling K. Brown, Laverne Cox, Jeremy Pope and Guillermo Diaz.

Also in 2021, after executive producing and directing 14 episodes of Station 19, Barclay directed two episodes each on the Ryan Murphy Netflix series Dahmer-Monster: The Jeffrey Dahmer Story (with Evan Peters, Richard Jenkins, and Niecy Nash) and The Watcher, (with Naomi Watts, Bobby Cannavale, Margo Martindale and Mia Farrow). All the episodes aired Fall 2022.

Despite controversies surrounding Dahmer, Barclay’s work on Episode 6, “Silenced,” received wide praise. Daniel Fienberg of The Hollywood Reporter wrote, "Directed with more empathy than voyeurism by Paris Barclay, ‘Silenced' tells the story of Tony Hughes (excellent newcomer Rodney Burnford [sic]), presented here as perhaps the only victim with whom Jeffrey had traces of a real relationship. It’s easily the best episode of the series, an uncomfortably sweet and sad hour of TV that probably should have been the template for the entire show. Tony was deaf and, in placing a Black, deaf, gay character at the center of the narrative, the series is giving voice to somebody whose voice has too frequently been excluded from gawking serial killer portraits.”

Kayla Cobb said in her review of “Silenced" for The Decider, “It’s not just the strongest episode of the entire series; it’s one of the most heart-wrenching episodes of the year.”

Most recently, he directed two episodes of FX series American Horror Story (with Russell Tovey, Joe Mantello, and Patti LuPone), and is in post-production on a feature documentary about the life of iconic keyboard and recording artist Billy Preston, due in 2023.

Directors Guild of America 
In June 2013, Barclay was elected President of the Directors Guild of America, the first African-American and first openly gay President in the history of the Guild. After the vote, Barclay expressed gratitude for the honor and admiration for the Union's history, saying "I am profoundly honored to be elected President of the DGA.... The DGA has worked for more than three-quarters of a century to advance the creative and economic rights of directors and their teams and I look forward to continuing this strong tradition of service. As the son of a glass blower and a tile maker from Chicago, I am extremely humbled to have the honor to serve in the footsteps of the legendary leaders of the DGA like Frank Capra, Robert Wise and Gil Cates." Barclay was nominated for the Presidency by past-President Michael Apted, who said of him, "Paris' qualifications for DGA president are exceptional.... His understanding of the issues facing directors and their teams is outstanding and his ability to resolve problems and create solutions is beyond compare." His nomination was seconded by Steven Soderbergh, who said of Barclay, "This is a great moment for our Guild; Paris will be a phenomenal leader as we move into the future." Barclay was enthusiastically re-elected in June 2015.

Before being elected DGA President, Barclay served four terms as First Vice President of the DGA, where he was the first African-American Officer in the history of the guild. While serving as First Vice President, Barclay was also chair of the DGA's Political Action Committee, whose mission it is to promote the interests of DGA members to state and federal lawmakers. Their top issues include battling online copyright threats and promoting production tax incentives. He also served on the Western Directors Council and co-chaired the Diversity Task Force, whose mission is to encourage the hiring of women and minority directors to networks and studios. In addition, Barclay served as a board member of the DGA-affiliated Franco-American Cultural Fund, which promotes cultural exchange between French and American directors.

Barclay completed his second term as DGA president in June 2017. He was succeeded by Thomas Schlamme, whom he worked with on The West Wing and Manhattan, as well as on the DGA board.

Barclay's work for the DGA continues even after his presidency: he helped create and teaches the Guild's First Time Director Orientation., and in the successful 2020 contract negotiations Barclay co-chaired the Television Creative Rights Committee. He also serves as the co-Chair of the DGA's Return to Work Committee, which created the protocols that brought the industry back to work after the COVID shutdown. In 2021, he was elected the Guild's Secretary/Treasurer.

In 2021, he was named an Honorary Life Member of the DGA, one of the guild's highest honors, recognizing his career achievements and leadership in the industry. His acceptance speech earned praise for its focus on his hopes for his two sons.

Reputation in the entertainment industry 
During his three decades as a director, Barclay has developed a strong reputation as a go-to director capable of working adeptly in multiple genres - described in a June 2011 article in Variety as a "highly adaptive force with the ability to control both TV detectives and scene-stealing gleesters". The same article ranked Barclay among the "Ten TV Directors Who Leave Their Mark." and another called him “one of the most reputable TV directors in Hollywood.”

Sons of Anarchy creator Kurt Sutter stated in an interview with The Star-Ledger that it wasn't until Barclay came on board to direct that the show found its "groove", observing: "We had all those glitches in those first two or three episodes [...] We had (Paris) come in [...] and we all just started trusting what we were doing here." Later in an interview for Variety, Kurt stated "The great thing about (exec producer Paris Barclay) is that he's a writer and he's also a director [...] so he can get the scripts and understand the production realities of it but also understand creatively what the need for everything is."

In an interview with TV Fanatic, Glee actor Blake Jenner credited Barclay for guiding him through a difficult scene in the episode "Lights Out", saying "He was just so nurturing."

In a piece for Vulture, television critic Matt Zoller Seitz cites Barclay as one of the few producer/directors who can "manage and drive the medium [of television]" as well as a writer-showrunner can. Seitz explains, "Directors tend to think in terms of images and moments; those skill sets aren't often compatible with the left-brain requirements of managing a sitcom or drama (though there are always exceptions; see veteran TV director Paris Barclay's executive-producer credit on FX's stylishly nasty biker drama, Sons of Anarchy)."

Ryan Murphy, creator of the Fox hit Glee, called Barclay's episode "Wheels" a "turning point for the show".

Over time, many of Barclay's former assistants have gone on to great Hollywood success in their own right. One of his first assistants was Kevin Williamson, writer of Scream and I Know What You Did Last Summer, and the creator and Executive Producer of the hit television shows Dawson’s Creek, The Vampire Diaries, and The Following. Josh Barry, another former Barclay assistant, was the head of the television department at Prospect Park after working as an executive in Drama Development at ABC. He was recently tapped to be the President of Shawn Levy's 21 Laps Television as part of a major deal with Netflix. Sam Martin, the former HBO executive (Bury My Heart at Wounded Knee, Lackwanna Blues) and film producer (Pariah) and Jason Clodfelter, former VP of Drama Development, and now Co-President at Sony Television, both previously served as Barclay assistants.

Awards
Along with winning two Emmy Awards for NYPD Blue (Outstanding Directing for a Drama Series - "Lost Israel Part II" and "Hearts and Souls"), Barclay has garnered another six Emmy nominations: two for producing NYPD Blue (Outstanding Drama Series), one for directing The West Wing (Outstanding Directing for a Drama Series - "Indians In The Lobby"), and three for directing Glee (Outstanding Directing for a Comedy Series - "Wheels", "Diva" and "100").

He has also received a Directors Guild of America Award for NYPD Blue and 10 other DGA Award nominations for The West Wing (3), In Treatment (2), NYPD Blue (2), ER, House, and Glee.

Barclay received an NAACP Image Award for Outstanding Drama Series as co-creator, writer, and director of the groundbreaking medical drama City of Angels, another Image Award for directing Cold Case, and a third Image Award for directing Smash. On February 22, 2014, the NAACP honored Barclay by inducting him into the NAACP Hall of Fame. The Hall of Fame Award is bestowed on an individual who is a pioneer in his or her respective field and whose influence will shape the profession for generations to come. Other recipients have included Lena Horne, Paul Robeson, Sidney Poitier, Bill Cosby and Oprah Winfrey.

Also a writer, Barclay received his first WGA Award nomination for co-writing Pedro with screenwriter Dustin Lance Black, marking the Oscar-winner's first WGA credit. The moving story of The Real World's Pedro Zamora garnered the team nominations for a GLAAD Media Award and Humanitas Prize.

Episodes directed by Barclay for Glee and In Treatment have become the recipients of the prestigious Peabody Award for excellence in broadcasting. The Glee episode "Wheels" was also acknowledged at the 2010 Shane's Inspiration Gala, receiving the Visionary Leadership Award for shining a light on the abilities of those with disabilities.

The Glee episode, "Wheels" and CSI: Crime Scene Investigation episode, "Coup de Grace" were both chosen for the Academy of Television Arts & Sciences' Television Academy Honor, saluting "Television with a Conscience," in which the Academy recognizes achievements in programming that present issues of concern to society in "a compelling, emotional, and insightful way." Barclay also accepted the Voice Award from the US Department of Health and Human Services on behalf of In Treatment, for "incorporating dignified, respectful, and accurate portrayals of people with mental illnesses."

In June 2011, Advertising Age featured Barclay on the cover as one of 2011's 50 Most Creative People, saying "Mr. Barclay brings an innate cultural awareness to shows." TV Guide also recognized his House episode, "Three Stories", as one of the 100 Best Episodes of All Time.

In April 2017, Barclay was awarded the Order of the Golden Sphinx by the acclaimed Hasty Pudding Institute of Harvard University – it is the highest honor bestowed by the Institute and recognizes individuals in the entertainment industry for their extraordinary contributions to the performing arts. The recipient represents the Institute's mission to support and foster performing arts within its membership, at Harvard, and around the world.

In addition to his honors in television, Barclay has been awarded the Founder's Award from Project Angel Food in 1998, the GLAAD Stephen F. Kolzak Award in 2001, to honor his outstanding representation of the LGBT community, and in 2004 the Pan-African Film Festival Pioneer Award. In 2009 Barclay was named by POWER UP as one of the Top Ten Gay Men in Entertainment; 2010 he received the Bridge Award from the Cornerstone Theater in Los Angeles for over 20 years of contributing to the theater. Barclay received the 2012 Upton Sinclair Award from the non-profit Liberty Hill for "unwavering idealism and vision.". Also in 2012, he and husband Christopher Barclay were awarded with the Family Values Award from In the Life Media, given to "individuals whose representation of LGBT families serve as an inspiration for all Americans. More recently, he's been awarded the Artistic Excellence Award from the Aviva Family & Children Services Program, the Visibility Award from the Human Rights Campaign, as well as the Legacy Award from the African-American Film Critics Association.

Work in musical theater
In the theater, Barclay presented his original musical On Hold With Music at Manhattan Theater Club in 1984, with a cast including Jason Alexander, Terry Burrell, John Dossett, Ray Gill, and Maureen Brennan. Based on his life in advertising, Barclay wrote and composed the sung through musical in its entirety.

In 1985, he wrote the book, music and lyrics for another musical drama entitled Almos' a Man, based on a short story by Richard Wright – which had been developed in the second year of the ASCAP Musical Theater Workshop in New York, under the tutelage of Charles Strouse and Stephen Sondheim. It was produced that year at Soho Rep, receiving a mixed review from the New York Times’ Mel Gussow.

After years of directing, Barclay returned to composing in September 2001 with the premiere of a musical based on the collection of letters Dear America: Letters Home from Vietnam. Called Letters from ‘Nam, the play featured Grammy winner Maureen McGovern, future Tony winner Levi Kreis, and David Burnham. Praised by most reviewers and opening days before the September 11 attacks in 2001, the Vietnam musical hit home emotionally with those who performed in it, produced it, or experienced it.

In 2003, Barclay wrote songs for and co-directed Order My Steps for the Cornerstone Theater Company. The musical play, with book by Tracey Scott Wilson, dealt with the African-American church's response to the AIDS epidemic. The Los Angeles Times call a "moving tale about the human toll of AIDS."

Barclay returned to Vietnam with One Red Flower: Letters from ‘Nam, a reworked version of the musical was produced at the Village Theater in Issaquah to further acclaim, with Levi Kreis and David Burnham reprising their roles. Other productions followed, with the most significant being Eric Schaeffer's "gritty and emotional" staging at the Signature Theatre in Arlington, Virginia in 2004.

In 2008, Barclay presented a reading of One Red Flower in Los Angeles to benefit New Directions, an organization that supports veterans of all wars. Maureen McGovern, Levi Kreis and David Burnham returned in featured roles, with television stars Hunter Parrish and Josh Henderson. Although it was not a full production, again it received glowing reviews, described by Beverly Cohn in the Santa Monica Mirror as an "evening that had the audience smiling with a lump in its throat."

Personal life 
Openly gay since late in his college days, he was a regular contributor to The Advocate for several years. Barclay married food-industry executive Christopher Barclay (né Mason), his partner of 10 years, in 2008. They have 2 children.

Filmography 
Directed episodes of (arranged in order from most episodes directed to least):

 In Treatment (36 episodes; also executive producer; Golden Globe nomination, 2 DGA nominations, and NAACP Image Award nomination)
 Sons of Anarchy (15 episodes, one NAACP Image Award nomination, also executive producer)
 Station 19 (14 episodes; also executive producer)
 NYPD Blue (12 episodes; 2 Emmy Awards; also supervising producer)
 Cold Case (9 episodes; also co-executive producer; NAACP Image Award)
 Glee (9 episodes, 3 Emmy nominations, 2 DGA nominations)
 The Bastard Executioner (4 episodes; also executive producer)
 City of Angels (4 episodes; NAACP Image Award for best drama series; also co-executive producer and co-creator)
 CSI: Crime Scene Investigation (4 episodes; 2 NAACP Image Award nominations)
 Pitch (4 episodes, NAACP Image Award nomination, also executive producer)
 The Shield (3 episodes; NAACP Image Award nomination)
 The West Wing (3 episodes; Emmy nomination, 3 DGA nominations)
 ER (3 episodes; DGA nomination)
 Sliders (3 episodes)
 The Watcher (2 episodes) 
 Dahmer – Monster: The Jeffrey Dahmer Story (2 episodes)
 American Horror Story: NYC (2 episodes)
 The Good Wife (2 episodes)
 Angel Street (2 episodes)
 Second Noah (2 episodes)
 Clueless (2 episodes)
 Monk (2 episodes)
 NCIS: Los Angeles (2 episodes)
 Dirt (2 episodes)
 Fastlane (2 episodes)
 Empire
 Scandal
 How to Get Away with Murder
 Diagnosis: Murder
 Brooklyn South
 American Dreams
 Huff
 Lost
 NUMB3RS
 House MD (DGA nomination)
 Weeds (DGA nomination)
 The Mentalist
 Miami Medical
 The New Normal
 Last Resort
 The Chicago Code
 Law & Order
 Silk Stalkings
 Moon Over Miami
 Rebel (ABC)

Television pilots:
 Station 19, for ABC
 Perfect Citizen, for CBS
 Pitch, for FOX
 The Bastard Executioner, for FX
 The Street Lawyer, based on the novel by John Grisham for ABC
 Dead Lawyers starring F. Murray Abraham for SyFy
 City of Angels with Blair Underwood and Viola Davis for CBS
 Hate starring Marcia Gay Harden for Showtime
 The Chang Family Saves the World written by John Ridley for ABC
 Big Mike starring Greg Grunberg for A&E
Television movies:
 The Cherokee Kid (HBO)
 The Big Time (TNT)

Feature Film:
 Don't Be a Menace to South Central While Drinking Your Juice in the Hood (Miramax)

References

External links 

1956 births
African-American film directors
African-American television directors
American music video directors
American television directors
Comedy film directors
American gay writers
Television producers from Illinois
American television writers
American male television writers
Film directors from Indiana
Harvard College alumni
La Lumiere School alumni
LGBT African Americans
LGBT people from Illinois
LGBT television directors
Living people
Businesspeople from Chicago
Presidents of the Directors Guild of America
Primetime Emmy Award winners
Directors Guild of America Award winners
Hasty Pudding alumni
Screenwriters from Illinois
People from Chicago Heights, Illinois
21st-century African-American people
20th-century African-American people
African-American Catholics